Geoffrey Vernon Miller (born 18 August 1937) is a former English cricketer.  Miller was a right-handed batsman who bowled right-arm off break.  He was born at Walsall, Staffordshire.

Miller made his debut for Cambridgeshire in the 1981 Minor Counties Championship against Lincolnshire.  From 1981 to 1986, he represented the county in 54 Minor Counties Championship matches.  Miller also played 5 MCCA Knockout Trophy matches for the county between 1983 and 1986.

Miller also played 3 List-A matches for Cambridgeshire, with his first coming against Warwickshire in the 1983 NatWest Trophy.  His final List-A match came in the 1986 NatWest Trophy against Yorkshire.  In his 3 List-A matches, he scored 30 runs at a batting average of 10.00, with a high score of 21.

References

External links
Geoffrey Miller at Cricinfo
Geoffrey Miller at CricketArchive

1937 births
Living people
Sportspeople from Walsall
Sportspeople from Staffordshire
English cricketers
Cambridgeshire cricketers